Törmönkhiin Mönkhzul (born 4 May 2002) is a Mongolian chess player who holds the title of Woman International Master (WIM, 2019).

Biography
In 2019 in Xingtai Turmunkh Munkhzul shared 3rd place in Asian Women's Chess Championship. In the same year she ranked in 3rd place in Women's World Chess Championship Eastern Asian Zonal tournament.

Turmunkh Munkhzul played for Mongolia in the Women's Chess Olympiads:
 In 2018, at third board in the 43rd Chess Olympiad (women) in Batumi (+6, =2, -2).

In 2021, in Sochi Turmunkh Munkhzul participated in Women's Chess World Cup where in 1st round won Marina Brunello with 2:0, but in 2nd round lost Polina Shuvalova with 0:2.

In 2019, she awarded the Women International Master (WIM) title.

References

External links

2002 births
Mongolian female chess players
Chess Woman International Masters
Chess Olympiad competitors
Living people
21st-century Mongolian women